The Kirtland Temple is a National Historic Landmark in Kirtland, Ohio, United States, on the eastern edge of the Cleveland metropolitan area.  Owned and operated by the Community of Christ, formerly the Reorganized Church of Jesus Christ of Latter Day Saints (RLDS), the house of worship was the first temple to be built by adherents of the Latter Day Saint movement. The design mixes the Federal, Greek Revival, and Gothic Revival architectural styles.

Construction

Beginning in 1831, members of the Church of Christ (Latter Day Saints), under the direction of church founder and president Joseph Smith, began to gather in the Kirtland area. In December 1832, Smith stated he received a revelation that called for the construction of a house of worship, education, and order. On May 6, 1833, Smith stated he had received a revelation from God, directing members of the church to construct "a house ... wholly dedicated unto the Lord for the work of the presidency," "dedicated unto the Lord from the foundation thereof, according to the order of the priesthood." Directions were given to build a "lower court and a higher court," and a promise given that the Lord's "glory shall be there, and [his] presence shall be there." This building, which would have sat next to the Kirtland Temple was never started, nor was the third building which was to be a house for the printing operations of the church. Instead the functions of this office building ended up in the attic of the Kirtland Temple. The date of this document is also in question as it makes reference to the Kirtland Temple which is described in the following section of the Doctrine Covenants and dated June 1, 1833.

Construction commenced soon thereafter, quarrying Berea sandstone from the base of Gildersleeve Mountain, and gathering lumber from the surrounding area, particularly from the gravel pits on the other side of Gildersleeve Mountain along Hobart Road.

Church members donated labor and building materials, including glass and pottery which was ground up into the stucco.

The Kirtland Temple was not originally white on the exterior as it is today.  The original exterior was a bluish-gray according to Truman Coe, a local minister in the 1830s.  The roof is believed to have been red, and the front doors olive green.  Presently, only the doors are the original color.

The first structure of its kind to be built by the Latter Day Saint movement, the Kirtland Temple is different in purpose from the Nauvoo Temple built in the 1840s. It is different in both design and purpose from the temples built by the Church of Jesus Christ of Latter-day Saints (LDS Church), the largest denomination of the movement, in latter years as they embraced and grew from Nauvoo temple theology.

The lower inner court is used primarily for various worship services. It has two sets of pulpits, one set on either end, and the pews featured an adjustable design which allowed the audience to face either end. The second floor was designed for education, and was to house a school for church leaders known as the "School of Mine Apostles" (See School of the Prophets). Use of the third floor alternated use between general academic classes during the day, church quorum meetings in the evenings, the Kirtland Theological Institution, the School of the Elders (possibly an enlargement of the school of the prophets, and may have been destined to become the school of mine apostles), church offices, including that of Smith, were also located on the third floor. At the time of construction, none of the ordinances associated with the LDS Church's temple worship, such as baptism by proxy, had been instituted.

Truman O. Angell recorded in his journal that about this time Frederick G. Williams, one of Smith's counselors, came into the temple one day during construction and related the following:

Joseph received the word of the Lord for him to take his two counselors, Frederick G. Williams and Sidney Rigdon, and come before the Lord and He would show them the plan or model of the house to be built. We went upon our knees, called on the Lord, and the building appeared within viewing distance. I being the first to discover it. Then all of us viewed it together. After we had taken a good look at the exterior, the building seemed to come right over us, and the makeup of this hall seemed to coincide with what I there saw to a minutia.

According to Leonard J. Arrington's economic history of the Latter Day Saint movement, Great Basin Kingdom, the completed temple had cost $40,000.

Temples of nearly identical design were planned at about the same time period in Missouri at Temple Lot (in Independence), Far West, and Adam-ondi-Ahman.  However, none were built because of the 1838 Mormon War which evicted the members from the state.

Many members of the church were important to the construction of the Kirtland Temple. Of particular note is Artemus Millet. He has been credited by many for providing the method of the exterior wall construction, head mason, creating the mix of the exterior stucco, and as the superintendent of construction for a portion of the work. There is some disagreement as to the question if Millet was baptized before or after his building skills were needed and recommended by Brigham and Joseph Young. Either way, he was baptized by Brigham and confirmed by Joseph while in Canada, and Millet came afterwards to help provide methods, labor, and financial support for the building of the Kirtland Temple.

Dedication

The temple was dedicated in a seven-hour service on March 27, 1836. A reported "one thousand persons" attended the gathering, which introduced such traditional dedication rites as the Hosanna Shout and singing of the hymn written by W. W. Phelps entitled "The Spirit of God Like a Fire Is Burning." Following a two-and-a-half hour sermon given by church leader Sidney Rigdon, Smith offered a dedicatory prayer that had been prepared by a committee of church leaders, which he indicated was given to him by revelation. Two other church leaders, Brigham Young and David W. Patten, were reported to have been inspired to speak in tongues following the prayer.  Truman O. Angell recorded in his journal the following account:

When about midway during the prayer, there was a glorious sensation passed through the house [Kirtland Temple]; and we, having our heads bowed in prayer, felt a sensation very elevating to the soul. At the close of the prayer, F. G. Williams being in the upper east stand- -Joseph being in the speaking stand next below--rose and testified that midway during the prayer an holy angel came and seated himself in the stand. When the afternoon meeting assembled, Joseph, feeling very much elated, arose the first thing and said the personage who had appeared in the morning was the Angel Peter come to accept the dedication.

Visions and miracles
On January 21, 1836, before the temple was completed, Smith reported the first of several visions received at the temple. As he and his associates performed a feet washing and anointing ritual, he saw "the celestial kingdom of God, and the glory thereof ... [and] the blazing throne of God, whereon was seated the Father and the Son." Smith also reported seeing Adam, Abraham, and three family members, only one of which had previously died; this experience of Smith was canonized by the LDS Church as revelation and published as Section 137 of the Doctrine and Covenants for the first time in 1981.

Not long after the dedication, several more visions were reported. On April 3, Smith had his scribe, Warren Cowdery, write down in his personal journal an account of a spiritual experience Smith and Oliver Cowdery had while praying in the pulpits. In this experience Joseph states that he and Oliver saw Jesus Christ "standing upon the breastwork of the pulpit." According to Smith's account, Christ accepted the church's dedication of the temple, and promised blessings according to their obedience. Following the conclusion of this vision of Christ, the account goes on to tell of Smith and Cowdery then receiving visions of Moses, Elias, and Elijah. The account in Smith's journal is the only known telling of this occurrence during his lifetime. The LDS Church canonized it as Section 110 of their Doctrine and Covenants in 1876.

Shifting ownership
Smith's time in Kirtland after the temple came into use was limited. In 1837, he became involved with the foundation of a bank known as the Kirtland Safety Society. The failure of this bank was a factor that caused a schism among Latter Day Saints in Kirtland. The dissenters were led by Warren Parrish, Smith's former secretary, and included Martin Harris, one of the Three Witnesses of the Book of Mormon. Parrish's group took control of the temple and other church property. By the beginning of 1838, Smith was forced to flee the state, relocating to Far West, Missouri with hundreds of loyalists.  After the Mormons moved west in 1838, the temple was used by the Western Reserve Teacher's Seminary. Parrish's group dissolved and by 1841 the remaining Latter Day Saints in Kirtland had come back into communion with the main body of the church, which had subsequently relocated to Nauvoo, Illinois.

A period of confusion followed Smith's death in 1844, as rival leaders and factions vied for control of the temple. In 1845, the Latter Day Saints in Kirtland, under the leadership of S. B. Stoddard, Leonard Rich and Jacob Bump organized their own church in opposition to those of Brigham Young, James J. Strang and other leaders. This group later merged with a faction led by William E. McLellin whose president was David Whitmer, one of the Three Witnesses.

By 1848, another Latter Day Saint faction led by Hazen Aldrich and James Collin Brewster was organized in Kirtland and maintained control of the temple. This faction also dissolved and most of the members who were in Kirtland eventually joined the Community of Christ (then known as the Church of Jesus Christ of Latter Day Saints, adding the word Reorganized to their name in 1872) led by Joseph Smith III. In 1860, a probate court in Ohio sold the Kirtland Temple as a means of paying off some debts owned by Joseph Smith's estate. Joseph Smith III and Mark Hill Forscutt purchased a quitclaim deed to the temple in 1874.

In 1880, the RLDS Church began the Kirtland Temple Suit, in an attempt to gain clear legal title to the temple. The court opinion stated that the RLDS Church was the lawful successor of the original church, but ultimately dismissed the case. Although the case had no legal bearing, the Community of Christ secured ownership of the temple through adverse possession by at least 1901.

The local RLDS congregation met in the building on a regular basis for Sunday worship until the 1950s. Due to preservation concerns, a new church was built across the street (for the congregation) and the temple saw more direct management and funding from the world church. Today, the building is used for approximately 50 to 60 worship services, classes, retreats and other special events throughout the year primarily by various Latter Day Saint denominations.

Unlike the later built Nauvoo Temple, the Kirtland Temple was never destroyed or burned down.  The same stones from the original construction are still in place today. Although the majority of church members left the Kirtland area for Missouri in 1838, the Kirtland Temple was never completely abandoned by the church. From its inception to the present day it has always been in the possession of members of the original and schismatic Latter Day Saint movements. It has been a place of worship and a symbol of the movement since it was dedicated in 1836.

E. Cecil McGavin says the temple was used as a barn for their animals. "The ... beneficiaries of the Mormon exodus from Ohio did not need a house of worship as large as the temple, so they used it as a barn. They made a sloping driveway into the basement, using that large room as a shelter for the milch cows of the community during the winter months", "while they filled the ground floor room with sheep"

Present day
The Kirtland Temple was used as the meetinghouse for Kirtland's RLDS congregation until the 1950s, when a modern church was built across the street. Today, the temple is usually experienced through guided tours, community services, and prearranged meetings for out-of-town groups.

Each year tens of thousands take tours of the temple. Temple guides are typically local residents, usually but not always members of the Community of Christ. During the busy summer months, college-aged adults augment the Temple's staff as part of the Alma Blair Internship Program. Throughout the year, other volunteers travel to the temple for stints as guides, maintenance staff, or gardeners.

There are about 50 worship services and/or educational events held each year at the Kirtland Temple. The temple holds community services for Thanksgiving, Christmas Eve, and Holy Week, as well as the annual Emma Smith Hymn Festival in June. Additionally, members of various Latter Day Saint denominations travel to the temple where they are permitted to hold their own services with prior arrangement.

A Spiritual Formation and Visitors' Center was opened in March 2007. The center's exterior is inspired by that of the Kirtland Temple, and its layout has been described as reflecting a dove. It enhances the ministries of the temple by providing classroom space, worship space, a multi-use theater, offices, and a small museum. The museum contains artifacts related to the temple and original documents from the Kirtland era. There is also a museum gift shop which features a broad selection of books on Latter Day Saint history and the various expressions of the movement.

A historic cemetery and gardens are located outside the temple.

Footnotes

Further reading
 Truman O. Angell, Autobiography (1810-1856) in "His Journal," Our Pioneer Heritage 10 (1967):195-213.
 Marilyn Chiat, North American Churches. Lincolnwood, IL: Publications International, Ltd., 2004.
 David J. Howlett, Kirtland Temple: The Biography of a Shared Mormon Space. Urbana, IL: University of Illinois Press, 2014.
 Roger Launius, The Kirtland Temple: A Historical Narrative. Independence, Missouri: Herald Publishing House, 1986.
 Elwin C. Robison, The First Mormon Temple: Design, Construction, and Historic Context of the Kirtland Temple, Provo, UT: BYU Press, 1997.

External links

Wikisource - Kirtland Temple Dedication - Account of Kirtland Temple dedication from March 1836 issue of Messenger and Advocate, an early Latter Day Saint periodical
Kirtland Temple – official website
Architectural drawings of the Kirtland Temple from the Library of Congress
Kirtland Temple Historic Site

Religious buildings and structures of the Community of Christ
Buildings and structures in Lake County, Ohio
National Register of Historic Places in Lake County, Ohio
National Historic Landmarks in Ohio
Churches on the National Register of Historic Places in Ohio
Churches in Ohio
Museums in Lake County, Ohio
Religious museums in Ohio
Latter Day Saint movement in Ohio
Tourist attractions in Lake County, Ohio
Churches completed in 1836
19th-century Latter Day Saint temples
Church of Christ (Latter Day Saints)
Mormon museums in the United States
1836 establishments in Ohio